Roots on the River, Bellows Falls, VT – June 9th, 2007 is a live recording of Gandalf Murphy and the Slambovian Circus of Dreams' set at the 2007 Roots on the River Festival. 

This is single disc which contains the full set, both songs and introductions.

This is a "Bootleg Series" album which is generally only available for sale at live shows.

Track listing

"Intro" – 0:40
"Desire" – 5:27
"Circus of Dreams" - 5:51
"Folsom Prison Pinball" - 2:37
"Yodel Song" – 7:57
"Picture" – 6:07
"Already Broken" – 8:12
"I Know It's You (Tink)" – 8:08
"Nani Wan" – 2:55
"Cities" - 6:37
"Gates of Eden" - 8:32
"Alice in Space" - 5:06

See also
 

Gandalf Murphy and the Slambovian Circus of Dreams albums
2007 live albums